Spatalistis katmandana is a species of moth of the family Tortricidae. It is found in Nepal. The habitat consists of mixed primary forests.

The forewings are white cream, but whitish in the terminal third with numerous silver spots. The costa is yellowish brown, dotted with brown and there is a brownish line perpendicular to the dorsum at the tornus. The hindwings are whitish, mixed with pale brown at the apex.

Etymology
The species name refers to Kathmandu District, the type locality.

References

Moths described in 2012
katmandana